An ironmaster is the manager, and usually owner, of a forge or blast furnace for the processing of iron. It is a term mainly associated with the period of the Industrial Revolution, especially in Great Britain.

The ironmaster was usually a large scale entrepreneur and thus an important member of a community.  He would have a large country house or mansion as his residence.  The organization of operations surrounding the smelting, refining and casting of iron was labour-intensive, and so there would be numerous workers reliant on the furnace works.

There were ironmasters (possibly not called such) from the 17th century onwards, but they became more prominent with the great expansion in the British iron industry during the Industrial Revolution.

17th century ironmasters (examples)
An early ironmaster was John Winter (about 1600–1676) who owned substantial holdings in the Forest of Dean. During the English Civil War he cast cannons for Charles I. Following the Restoration, Winter developed his interest in the iron industry, and experimented with a new type of coking oven. This was a precursor to the later work of Abraham Darby I who successfully used coke to smelt iron.

18th century ironmasters (examples)

Abraham Darby
Three successive generations of the same family all bearing the name Abraham Darby are renowned for their contributions to the development of the English iron industry. Their works at Coalbrookdale in Shropshire nurtured the start of improvements in metallurgy that allowed large-scale production of the iron that made the development of the steam engine and railways possible, although their most notable innovation was The Iron Bridge.

John Wilkinson
One of the best known ironmasters of the early part of the industrial revolution was John Wilkinson (1728–1808), who was considered to have "iron madness", extending even to making cast iron coffins. Wilkinson's patented method for boring iron cylinders were first used to create cannons, but later provided the precision needed to create James Watt's first steam engines.

Samuel Van Leer
Samuel Van Leer was a well known Ironmaster during the American Revolutionary War and United States Army officer. He started a military career with enthusiasm with his neighbor General Anthony Wayne in 1775. His furnace Reading Furnace supplied cannon and cannon balls for the Continental Army. Van Leer's furnace was a center of colonial iron making and is associated with the introduction of the Franklin Stove, and the retreat of George Washington's army following its defeat at the Battle of Brandywine, where they came for musket repairs. The location is listed as a temporary George Washington Headquarter.W Van Leer's children would all join the iron business as well.

19th century ironmasters (examples)

Lowthian Bell

Lowthian Bell (1816–1904) was, like Abraham Darby, the forceful patriarch of an ironmaking dynasty. Both his son Hugh Bell and his grandson Maurice Bell were directors of the Bell iron and steel company. His father, Thomas Bell, was a founder of Losh, Wilson and Bell, an iron and alkali company. The firm had works at Walker, near Newcastle upon Tyne, and at Port Clarence, Middlesbrough, contributing largely to the growth of those towns and of the economy of the northeast of England. Bell accumulated a large fortune, with mansions including Washington New Hall, Rounton Grange near Northallerton, and the mediaeval Mount Grace Priory near Osmotherley.

Henry Bolckow and John Vaughan

Henry Bolckow (1806–1878) and John Vaughan (1799–1868) were lifelong business partners, friends, and brothers-in-law. They established what became the largest of all Victorian era iron and steel companies, Bolckow Vaughan, in Middlesbrough. Bolckow brought financial acumen, and Vaughan brought ironmaking and engineering expertise. The two men trusted each other implicitly and "never interfered in the slightest degree with each other's work. Mr. Bolckow had the entire management of the financial department, while Mr. Vaughan as worthily controlled the practical work of the establishment." At its peak the firm was the largest steel producer in Britain, possibly in the world.

Andrew Handyside

Andrew Handyside (1805-1887) was born in Edinburgh and set up works in Derby where he made ornamental items, bridges and pillar boxes, many of which survive today.

See also
 Pig iron
 Wrought iron

References

 
Industrial Revolution
History of metallurgy
Metalworking occupations